Bright Friday (born 13 December 1998) is a Nigerian footballer who currently plays as a midfielder.

Career statistics

Club

Notes

References

1998 births
Living people
Nigerian footballers
Nigerian expatriate footballers
Association football midfielders
Kategoria e Parë players
KS Shkumbini Peqin players
Nigerian expatriate sportspeople in Albania
Expatriate footballers in Albania
Sportspeople from Lagos
FK Tomori Berat players